Ecclesall Ward—which includes the neighbourhoods of Banner Cross, Bents Green, Carterknowle, Ecclesall, Greystones, Millhouses,  and Ringinglow—is one of the 28 electoral wards in the City of Sheffield, England. The population of this ward in 2007 was 19,211 people in 7,626 households, reducing to 6,657 at the 2011 Census. Ecclesall ward is one of the four wards that make up the South West Community Assembly and one of five wards that make up the Sheffield Hallam Parliamentary constituency. The Member of Parliament is Olivia Blake, a Labour MP. Ecclesall is one of the least socially deprived wards in the entire country, with a 2002 deprivation score of 4.7—making it the 8,105th most deprived (hence 309th least deprived) ward out of 8,414 wards in the country. The demographic consists largely of white, middle-class families.

History
Evidence of early occupation of the area can be found in Ecclesall Woods. A cup and ring-marked stone was discovered in 1981, and has been dated to the late Neolithic or Bronze Age periods. It, and the area a  diameter around it, is a scheduled ancient monument.

Ecclesall electoral ward was created 1934 when the old Ecclesall Bierlow ward was divided into Ecclesall, Broomhill and Hallam.

The boundaries of the ward include about half of the area that was historically known as Ecclesall Bierlow—one of the six 'townships' that made up the old Parish of Sheffield. Ecclesall Bierlow encompassed most of the land between the River Sheaf and the Porter Brook from The Moor to Ringinglow. It also included the areas of Broomhall and Crookesmoor to the north of Porter Brook. Though this area contained numerous small villages and hamlets, there was never a village called Ecclesall.

In ancient times this area was part of the Barnsdale Forest that, together with Sherwood Forest, made up the forest of the Robin Hood legends. The River Sheaf marked the boundary between the Anglo-Saxon kingdoms of Mercia and Deira (later Northumbria). In fact the earliest historical record of this area refers to the submission of the Northumbrian army to Egbert of Wessex at nearby Dore in 829.
 The name Ecclesall (either from Heeksel-Hallr meaning the witches' hill, or Eccles (church) halh (hollow)) is not mentioned in the Domesday Book of 1086—at that time Ecclesall was a part of the manor of Hallam. The name is first found about 150 years later in the name of Sir Ralphus De Ecclesall a knight of the realm who had settled in the area. The De Ecclesall family gave land to the monks at Beauchief and established a corn mill on the river Sheaf, which they subsequently also gave to Beauchief Abbey. Many of the buildings of Ecclesall corn mill can still be seen at the northern end of Millhouses park—the district of Millhouses taking its name from this mill. In payment for the mill the monks of Beauchief were to provide a canon to say prayers daily at the Ecclesall chapel. These services continued at the chapel until the Dissolution of the Monasteries when Beauchief Abbey was abandoned. The chapel was restored in 1622 but was demolished when the present church was built nearby in 1788.

Until the 19th century Ecclesall Bierlow was very sparsely populated—in 1801 there were just 5362 people. This changed with the coming of the industrial revolution and the subsequent expansion of nearby Sheffield and by 1831 the population had increased to 14,239. In 1837 the Ecclesall Bierlow Poor Law Union came into being. As well as Ecclesall Bierlow, this encompassed Nether Hallam, Upper Hallam, Beauchief, Dore, Norton, and Totley. A workhouse was built on Cherry Tree Hill at Nether Edge. In 1929 the Ecclesall Bierlow Workhouse was renamed Nether Edge Hospital and it remained in use as a hospital into the 1990s.

Historic sites within the ward include Abbeydale Industrial Hamlet and Shepherd Wheel (both now museums). Ecclesall Wood has many examples of white coal kilns and the grave of a wood collier who was killed here when his cabin burned down on 11 October 1786.

Neighbourhoods

Banner Cross
Banner Cross is a district of Sheffield centred on the intersection of Ecclesall Road and Psalter Lane. This district is split evenly between Nether Edge and Ecclesall Wards. Banner Cross Hall, an ancient esquire seat, was virtually rebuilt in 1820. The main place of worship is Banner Cross Methodist Church. The nearby Banner Cross pub gained infamy when the notorious criminal Charles Peace shot and killed Arthur Dyson in the passageway beside the pub on 29 November 1876. The base of an old stone cross still remained at Banner Cross in 1819. Addy (1888) suggested that the name derives from bæna kross, meaning the cross of prayers.

Carter Knowle
Carter Knowle or Carterknowle lies south of Brincliffe Edge, between Ecclesall Road and Abbeydale.  A residential area, which includes what was originally known as Knab Farm Estate. Housing was built on former farmland there, in the valley between Brincliffe Edge and the upper part of Carter Knowle Road during the late 1950s / early 1960s by local building firm Gleesons. The area was home to Sheffield College's Bannerdale campus, but after its closure and demolition, a new educational academy, the Mercia School was opened on the site adjacent to Carter Knowle Road in September 2018.

Ecclesall
The district of Ecclesall is centred roughly on Ecclesall parish church at the intersection of Carter Knowle Road and Ecclesall Road. The present church, dedicated to All Saints, was built in 1788, consecrated in 1789 and has been altered several times since.  Banner Cross Hall, also in the area, was built in 1820.

Greystones
Greystones lies to the north of the district of Ecclesall. It is on a headland overlooking the Porter valley to the north and west.

Millhouses

Millhouses lies to the south of the district of Ecclesall. Its origins lie in a small hamlet that grew around the Ecclesall Corn Mill.

Bents Green
Bents Green lies to the west of the district of Ecclesall

Ringinglow

Ringinglow is a village on the western border of Ecclesall Ward. Although it is within the boundary of the City of Sheffield, it is self-contained, entirely surrounded by open countryside. It is focussed on the intersections of Fulwood Lane and Houndkirk Road with Ringinglow Road.

Transport
Ecclesall Road is the main road (A625) from central Sheffield to the south-west, at first following the Porter Brook, then running through Ecclesall and Dore. The road is a major shopping area. Attractions including the Sheffield Botanical Gardens and the Sheffield General Cemetery lie alongside it, as does one of the campuses of Sheffield Hallam University. Abbeydale Road South (A621) is another major road that runs through the ward. The Midland Main Line railway line runs along the southern boundary of the ward, though the closest stations are outside of the ward at Sheffield and Dore & Totley, the former Millhouses & Ecclesall station was closed on 10 June 1968. The Sheffield Supertram currently has no routes through Ecclesall ward, but a planned extension to Dore would skirt the southern boundary.

Parks and recreation
About half of Ecclesall ward is made up of rural areas, parkland, or woodland. These areas include a large portion of the  Ecclesall Woods, an area of ancient woodland that is known locally for being a bluebell wood. In the north section of the ward is Bingham Park, Whiteley Woods and part of the Porter valley; Millhouses Park marks the ward's southern boundary. The ward also includes some of Whirlow Brook Park and the Limb valley. The Sheffield Round Walk skirts the ward, running through a number of these parks.

Education
There are two secondary schools within Ecclesall ward, High Storrs School and Silverdale School. The ward also includes Ecclesall Infants and Junior Schools, Dobcroft Junior School, Greystones Primary School, Mylnhurst Convent School, and St Wilfrid's Primary School.

References and notes

Bibliography

 Harvey, Peter (1996). Abbeydale and Millhouses. Stround: The Charlford Publishing Company Limited. 
 Hunter, Joseph (1819). The Township of Ecclesall Byerlow. In Hallamshire. The History and Topography of the Parish of Sheffield in the County of York, pp195–219. London: Lackington, Hughes, Harding, Mayor & Jones.
 Vickers, J. Edward MBE (1999). Ecclesall. In Old Sheffield Town. An Historical Miscellany (2nd ed.), pp58–64. Sheffield: The Hallamshire Press Limited. .

External links
 Sources for the history of Ecclesall Produced by Sheffield City Council's Libraries and Archives

Wards of Sheffield